Foster Stephen Friess (April 2, 1940 – May 27, 2021) was an American investment manager and prominent donor to the Republican Party and to Christian right causes. He unsuccessfully sought the Republican nomination for governor of Wyoming in the 2018 election, losing in the primary to State Treasurer Mark Gordon. 

In 1999, CNBC dubbed Friess one of the "century’s great investors." In a 2001 article, BusinessWeek suggested Friess "may be the longest-surviving successful growth-stock picker, having navigated markets for 36 years, in his own firm since 1974."

Personal life
Friess was born on April 2, 1940, in Rice Lake, Wisconsin, the son of Ethel (Foster) and Albert Friess. He grew up on a farm, where his father was a cattle dealer. As a student at Rice Lake High School, Friess was valedictorian of his class and a member of the basketball and track teams.

A first-generation college graduate, Friess attended the University of Wisconsin (now University of Wisconsin–Madison), where he earned a degree in business administration. As a student, he served as president of Chi Phi fraternity, enrolled in the Reserve Officers' Training Corps, and was named one of the "ten most outstanding senior men." In 1962, he married fellow student Lynnette Estes, with whom he had four children. Friess was a born-again Christian.

Personal style

Friess often joked about his wealth in public appearances, while at the same time drawing attention to his financial status. In early 2020, he said on his website that his business was worth $15 billion. although in 2012 he had told a reporter that he was not a billionaire. Estimates at that time placed his wealth in the hundreds of millions. At an event to celebrate Friess' 70th birthday, he gave away $7.7 million to the guests' favorite charities. He typically wore a cowboy hat in public. He embraced the Western image as part of moving to Jackson Hole, Wyoming, in 1992. He said he made the move because Wyoming's lack of an income tax helped him avoid "increasingly onerous" taxes in Pennsylvania. Progressive website ThinkProgress has slandered Friess as funding Islamophobic campaigns, while he also made statements supporting gay rights, citing them as an issue of religious liberty. He made a comment in jest during a media interview, when asked on the issue of birth control, he repeated an old joke that women should simply put an aspirin between their knees rather than take birth control.

Career
After graduating from college, Friess trained to be an infantry platoon leader and served as the intelligence officer for the 1st Guided Missile Brigade at Fort Bliss, Texas. In 1964, he began his investment career, joining the Brittingham family-controlled NYSE member firm in Wilmington, Delaware, where he eventually rose to the position of Director of Research.

In 1974, Friess and his wife launched their own investment management firm, Friess Associates, LLC. Although success came slowly in its early years, the firm grew to over $15.7 billion in assets managed. Forbes named the Brandywine Fund, a Friess Associates flagship that boasted an average of 20% annual gains in the decade ended 1990, as one of the decade's top performers.

In 2001, Friess Associates partnered with Affiliated Managers Group (AMG), an asset-management firm, to facilitate succession planning and to spread ownership among its partners. AMG acquired a majority interest in Friess Associates in October 2001 and held a 70% interest as of September 2011. A broad group of Friess partners, including senior management and researchers, held 20% equity ownership, while the Friess family retained 10%. The company was purchased by its employees in 2013.

Political activism

Friess was a longtime Republican Party mega-donor, giving millions of dollars to Republican and conservative causes, especially on the Christian right.

Friess donated $250,000 to Rick Santorum's re-election campaign in 2006, and at least that amount to the Republican Governors' Association. Friess largely funded Santorum's unsuccessful campaign for the 2012 Republican presidential nomination. Friess was instrumental in keeping Santorum's flagging campaign alive by financing a super PAC, the Red, White and Blue Fund, which ran television advertisements on behalf of Santorum, who was unable to run a television campaign with his own funds. According to campaign filings with the Federal Election Commission, Friess's contributions to the Red, White and Blue Fund amounted to more than 40% of its total assets, or $331,000 as of December 31, 2011.

In the wake of the 2012 New Hampshire Republican primary, and before the South Carolina primary, Friess told Politico that he was "putting together a challenge grant to encourage other wealthy donors to give to the Red, White and Blue Fund, ... he said [the fund] received a $1 million check" the day after the New Hampshire vote.  The million-dollar donation was conveyed in four checks between November 2011 and January 2012.

In addition to Santorum's faith, opposition to women’s abortion rights, and hawkish foreign policy leanings, the possibility of defeating incumbent President Barack Obama was a major component of Friess's decision to back Santorum's campaign. Friess reportedly considered major contributions to American Crossroads, the Superpac founded by  Republican National Committee chair Ed Gillespie and former George W. Bush White House strategist Karl Rove.

Friess also donated $100,000 to Wisconsin Governor Scott Walker to help defeat the Democrats' recall effort in 2011. He reportedly invested more than $3 million in conservative commentator Tucker Carlson's The Daily Caller website. At one of the semi-annual, private seminars held by the Koch brothers in June 2011, Friess was recognized for his donation exceeding $1 million to the Kochs' political activities.

While being interviewed by NBC correspondent Andrea Mitchell regarding contraception, Friess said, "And this contraceptive thing, my gosh, it's so – it's such – inexpensive, you know, back in my days, they used Bayer Aspirin for contraception. The gals put it between their knees and it wasn't that costly."

Friess was also an advisor to Turning Point USA, a conservative youth organization to which he donated seed money.

In October 2017, Friess said he was exploring a possible candidacy for the Senate challenging Wyoming Senator John Barrasso for the Republican nomination, at the request of Steve Bannon. However, in April 2018, he instead decided to enter the crowded Republican field to replace term-limited Governor Matt Mead. Friess was defeated in the primary, coming in second to State Treasurer Mark Gordon by 38,951 votes (33%) to 29,842 (25.3%).

Philanthropy
Friess and his wife ran the Friess Family Foundation, which declares its activities as including the support of Christian mobile medical services, sponsoring Water Mission's work to provide clean water in Malawi, and donating to relief and recovery efforts following natural disasters such as Hurricane Katrina, the 2004 Indonesian tsunami, and the 2010 Haiti earthquake.

Friess sponsored a matching grant program to raise $2 million for relief efforts for the 2004 Indonesian tsunami and traveled to the areas most affected by the earthquake and tsunami in order to speak with local church and organization leaders to identify the best efforts to support. He sponsored another matching grant for Hurricane Katrina relief efforts, raising more than $4 million.

He supported a YMCA development in Maryvale, Arizona, along with several local mentoring and ministry programs. He was the principal donor behind the Friess Family Community Campus, a $3.7 million complex equipped with football, baseball, softball fields, and a track at Rice Lake High School in his hometown.

Friess also gained fame when news of his 70th birthday party spread. At the lavish event he announced he would give one charity nominated by his guests $70,000. He surprised his guests by giving each of their favorite charities $70,000, totaling over $7 million. In addition, Friess was the primary donor to a Classical Christian school, Jackson Hole Classical Academy, located in Jackson, Wyoming. 

Friess won a number of awards for his religious work, including the 2012 Horatio Alger Award from the Horatio Alger Association of Distinguished Americans, Canterbury Medal from the Becket Fund for Religious Liberty, the Adam Smith Award from Hillsdale College the Albert Schweitzer Leadership Award from the Hugh O'Brian Youth Leadership Foundation the David R. Jones Award for Leadership in Philanthropy and a Medal of Distinction from the University of Delaware.

According to his website, Friess began in 2016 to support Rachel's Challenge, a non-profit organization started in the name of Rachel Scott, the first victim of the Columbine High School massacre, by matching all donations up to $100,000. Following the 2018 Parkland shooting, in a USA Today op-ed, Friess issued a $2.5 million challenge grant to groups like Sandy Hook Promise and Rachel's Challenge.

Later life
Friess was diagnosed with myelodysplasia, a bone marrow cancer, in September 2020.  He died on May 27, 2021, in Scottsdale, Arizona, at the age of 81.

Electoral history

References

External links

 
 
 National Christian Foundation Profile: Foster Friess
 
 Don't Fence Him In: Foster Friess explains his individualistic approach to managing the Brandywine fund. CNN Money, July 1, 2001
 Spot growth stocks – but at the right price MSN Money, accessed May 27, 2008

1940 births
2021 deaths
20th-century American businesspeople
21st-century American businesspeople
American Christians
American financial businesspeople
Candidates in the 2018 United States elections
Intelligent design advocates
Military personnel from Wisconsin
People from Rice Lake, Wisconsin
Wisconsin Republicans
Wisconsin School of Business alumni
Wyoming Republicans